The Belmont Charter School is an historic school building which is located in the Belmont neighborhood of Philadelphia, Pennsylvania. 

It was added to the National Register of Historic Places in 1988.

History and architectural features
The building was designed by Irwin T. Catharine and built in 1927. It is a three-story, brick building, which was erected on a raised basement and designed in the Late Gothic Revival-style. It features a two-story, projecting stone bay window over the main entrance.

It was added to the National Register of Historic Places in 1988. 

Since 2002, the school has been used as a charter school that is operated by the Community Education Alliance of West Philadelphia.

References

External links

School buildings on the National Register of Historic Places in Philadelphia
Gothic Revival architecture in Pennsylvania
School buildings completed in 1927
Charter schools in Pennsylvania
West Philadelphia
Public elementary schools in Philadelphia
Public middle schools in Pennsylvania
1927 establishments in Pennsylvania